Northern Girl or Northern Girls may refer to:

Northern Girls (北妹, Bei Mei), prize-winning novel by Sheng Keyi
Northern Girl (Prime Minister song)
"Northern Girl", song by Terri Clark, single from Roots and Wings (Terri Clark album)